Matthew Landry Jones (born April 4, 1989) is a former American football quarterback. He played college football at Oklahoma, and was selected by the Pittsburgh Steelers in the fourth round (115th overall) of the 2013 NFL Draft. He also played for the Jacksonville Jaguars, Oakland Raiders, and Dallas Renegades.

Early years
Jones was born in Artesia, New Mexico. He attended Artesia High School, where he originally lettered as a running back, but later became the starting quarterback and led the high school football team to two consecutive Class 4A state championships, throwing for a combined 7,013 yards and 89 touchdowns. As a senior in 2007, Jones threw for 3,433 yards and 45 touchdowns on zero interceptions. Artesia won its second consecutive Class 4A championship, against Goddard High School, in which Jones threw for 325 yards and seven touchdowns, a school record. Jones was later named New Mexico's Class 4A Player of the Year and was a finalist for the Joe Montana Quarterback of the Year Award.

Jones was a highly regarded recruit and was among the highest rated quarterbacks for the Class of 2008 by several ratings publishers, including a four-star rating by both Scout.com (sixth-rated quarterback) and Rivals.com (sixth-rated pro-style quarterback), and a five-star rating from 247 Sports; according to all three sources, Landry is the highest-ranked recruit to ever come out of New Mexico. He was recruited by many schools, including Alabama, Arizona, Michigan, Notre Dame, Oregon, Stanford, Texas, USC, UCLA, and Wisconsin. He later committed to the University of Oklahoma, calling it "the QB college."

College career

2008 season
While attending the University of Oklahoma, Jones played for the Oklahoma Sooners football team from 2008 to 2012. In 2008, third-string quarterback Keith Nichol transferred to Michigan State, leaving senior Joey Halzle and Jones, who was redshirted his freshman year, as backup quarterbacks to Sam Bradford.

2009 season
In 2009, in the season opener against Brigham Young, Jones took over as the starting quarterback for the Sooners after Bradford suffered a shoulder injury; the Sooners went on to lose the game by a score of 14–13. However, in the next game, his first as the starter, Jones completed 18-of-32 passes for 286 yards, with three touchdowns and an interception in the Sooners 64–0 win against Idaho State. In his second start, Jones threw a Sooner-record six touchdown passes with two interceptions in a 45–0 win against Tulsa. Later that week, Jones was named AT&T All- America Player of the Week.

Jones started the next game against the Miami Hurricanes due to Sam Bradford not being fully recovered from his shoulder injury. The Sooners lost the game, 21–20. Jones threw for one touchdown, but also had a fumble deep in Sooner territory that resulted in a Miami score on the next play. The next week against Baylor, Sam Bradford was able to return and Landry was relegated to the backup quarterback spot once again. The Oklahoma offense was sluggish and inconsistent at times, but was easily able to beat the Bears and was looking forward to the Red River Rivalry with Texas. On the second offensive series of the game, Bradford went down again with the same shoulder injury and Landry was thrust back into action against a very stout Texas defense. Marred by turnovers and mistakes by an inexperienced offense, the Sooners lost a close battle with the Longhorns, 16–13. Jones managed a touchdown pass to wide receiver Ryan Broyles to tie the game in the third quarter.

Jones would become the starter for the rest of the season as Sam Bradford announced he would have season ending surgery on his shoulder and would then be leaving early for the NFL draft. With big shoes to fill, Jones slowly progressed throughout the season in wins against Kansas, Kansas State, and Texas A&M as well as some poor performances in losses to Nebraska (5 interceptions) and Texas Tech. With a dominant victory over BCS-hopeful Oklahoma State, the Sooners received a bid to play in the 2009 Sun Bowl against Stanford. Jones had his best passing performance of the year with 418 yards and 3 touchdown passes to Ryan Broyles, giving the Sooners their first bowl win since 2005 and propelling the team towards an optimistic 2010 in which Landry would have a full spring and fall camp to prepare as the starting quarterback.

2010 season

In 2010, Jones continued his starting job as Oklahoma's quarterback and guided the team through its first four out-of-conference victories. He would continue his dominant performance heading into the Red River Shootout, and defeated Texas by a score of 28–20. After the strong start, Jones would suffer his first setback against Missouri by losing the game, 36–27. He would lead Oklahoma on a rebound with a few top-notch performances before suffering the second and final setback of the season against Texas A&M. After the defeat, Jones would lead the team on another rebound by winning the rest of the way, including a highly anticipated matchup against the Oklahoma State Cowboys in the annual Bedlam Series. The match was settled in the last minute, but Jones's incredible passing performance led Oklahoma past its in-state rival by a score of 47–41.

By rule of a tie-breaker, Oklahoma went into the Big 12 Championship Game facing its storied rival Nebraska. After trailing by 17 points, Jones led the Sooners to a comeback 23–20 victory. After the win, Oklahoma went into the Fiesta Bowl as the champion of the Big 12 Conference, facing Connecticut as the champion of the Big East Conference. Oklahoma entered the game looking to break its recent streak of BCS bowl losses, while Connecticut was playing its first BCS bowl ever. Jones had a great night and carried his team over Connecticut by a lopsided score of 48–20 to break the BCS bowl losing streak and to win Oklahoma's first BCS bowl since 2002.

2011 season

In 2011, Jones led the Sooners on dominant performances against opening foes such as Tulsa and Florida State. He would outdo his last year's performance in the Red River Shootout by defeating Texas by a score of 55–17. The Sooners suffered their first setback against Texas Tech, losing by a score of 41–38 at home after two missed field goals. He would continue Oklahoma's dominance before losing his lead wide receiver Ryan Broyles to a knee injury against Texas A&M. After the loss, Jones entered a slump that included two losses to the Baylor Bears and the Oklahoma State Cowboys. Jones ended up leading the Sooners to a victory in the Insight Bowl against the Iowa Hawkeyes to bring the Sooners another double digit winning season.

2012 season
On January 5, 2012, Jones announced he was returning to Oklahoma for his senior season. In 2012, he led the Sooners to a 10–2 record overall (8–1 in the Big 12), and shared the Big 12 Conference Championship with Kansas State. Jones's turnovers were the difference in an early season loss to Kansas State, but he played well throughout the rest of the season. They faced former Big 12 member, Texas A&M in the Cotton Bowl Classic, where they lost 41-13. Jones finished the season with a completion percentage of 66 percent with 4,267 passing yards, 30 touchdowns, and 11 interceptions. He finished his collegiate career with 16,646 passing yards and 123 touchdowns.

Statistics

Professional career

Pittsburgh Steelers

2013–2014 seasons
The Pittsburgh Steelers drafted Jones in the fourth round (115th pick overall) of the 2013 NFL Draft. He signed a four-year, $2.59 million contract with a $439,220 signing bonus on June 12, 2013. The Steelers drafted him to develop into a long term back-up quarterback, replacing retired quarterbacks Charlie Batch and Byron Leftwich.

Prior to the 2015 NFL season, Jones was primarily the third-string quarterback behind longtime starting quarterback Ben Roethlisberger and back-up Bruce Gradkowski.

2015 season
During the 2015 pre-season, Gradkowski was injured and missed the entire 2015 regular season. Due to this injury, Jones received the majority of the starting reps in the pre-season. The Steelers signed veteran Michael Vick to replace Gradkowski due to Jones's lack of experience.

On October 18, 2015, during the Steelers' Week 6 game against the Arizona Cardinals, Jones made his NFL debut, replacing an injured Vick in the third quarter with the Steelers down 10–6. He finished the game with 168 passing yards and two touchdowns to Martavis Bryant, as he led the Steelers to a 25–13 comeback win. Jones played in seven games, starting two, in 2015, completing 32-of-55 passes for three touchdowns and four interceptions. He also relieved an injured Roethlisberger in the Steelers' wild-card playoff victory against the Cincinnati Bengals, completing 2-of-5 passes for 11 yards and an interception. However, Roethlisberger later returned to the game.

2016 season
On October 23, 2016, Jones received his first start of the season against the New England Patriots after Roethlisberger suffered a torn meniscus the week prior. He finished the 27–16 loss completing 29-of-47 pass attempts for 281 passing yards, one touchdown, and one interception. Due to the Steelers resting some of their starters for the playoffs, Jones started the season finale, completing 24-of-37 passes for 277 yards and three touchdowns with one interception, as the Steelers defeated the Cleveland Browns in overtime by a score of 27–24. The game-winning touchdown was a pass from Jones to wide receiver Cobi Hamilton.

2017 season
On March 9, 2017, Jones signed a two-year contract extension with the Steelers. Due to the Steelers resting some of their starters, he started the final game of the 2017 regular season, completing 23 of 27 passes for 239 yards, one touchdown, and one interception as the Steelers defeated the Cleveland Browns by a score of 28–24.

2018 season
After drafting Mason Rudolph in the third round of the 2018 NFL Draft, the Steelers released Jones on September 1, 2018.

Jacksonville Jaguars
On October 31, 2018, the Jacksonville Jaguars signed Jones following an injury to starting quarterback Blake Bortles. He was released on November 19, 2018.

Oakland Raiders
On March 26, 2019, Jones signed with the Oakland Raiders. He was later cut on May 22, 2019.

Following his release from the Raiders roster, Jones briefly took a minimum wage position at a construction company in Fort Worth. The San Antonio Commanders of the Alliance of American Football offered Jones over $1,000,000 to sign, but sensing correctly that the Alliance did not have the funds to cover the promise, he declined.

Dallas Renegades
On August 15, 2019, Jones signed with the XFL, which was scheduled to begin play in 2020. He was the first player to sign with the league. The Steelers called the XFL office to ask about signing Jones after starting quarterback Ben Roethlisberger suffered a season-ending injury on September 15, 2019, but the XFL blocked them. On October 15, 2019, the XFL allocated Jones to the Dallas Renegades, reuniting him with his college coach Bob Stoops. Jones suffered a knee injury on January 7, 2020, during a training camp and was expected to miss 4–6 weeks. Jones returned in week 2 of the 2020 XFL season and passed for 305 yards in a 25-18 victory over the Los Angeles Wildcats. On February 22, Jones completed 30 of 41 passes for 274 yards, three touchdowns and two interceptions leading Dallas to a 24-12 win over the Seattle Dragons. He had his contract terminated when the league suspended operations on April 10, 2020 and opted not to return when the league returned in 2023.

Career statistics

Regular season

Postseason

Personal life
Jones was named after Dallas Cowboys coach Tom Landry. Jones is a Christian and was featured in an "I Am Second" video proclaiming his faith in Jesus Christ. He married former Oklahoma Sooner women's basketball guard Whitney Hand-Jones on July 6, 2012. His wife was drafted by the San Antonio Stars in the 2013 WNBA draft in the third round with the 32nd overall pick.

See also
List of Division I FBS passing yardage leaders
List of Division I FBS passing touchdown leaders

References

External links

Oklahoma Sooners bio

1989 births
Living people
People from Artesia, New Mexico
American Christians
Players of American football from New Mexico
American football quarterbacks
Oklahoma Sooners football players
Under Armour All-American football players
Pittsburgh Steelers players
Jacksonville Jaguars players
Oakland Raiders players
Dallas Renegades players